Myrtle Springs is a census-designated place (CDP) in Van Zandt County, Texas, United States. It was a new CDP for the 2010 census with a population of 828.

Geography
Myrtle Springs is located at  (32.615084, -95.932873).

References

Census-designated places in Van Zandt County, Texas
Census-designated places in Texas